At least three ships of the Hellenic Navy have borne the name Navarinon :

  was an E-class destroyer, launched as HMS Echo in 1934 and renamed  on transfer to Greece in 1944. She was returned to the Royal Navy in 1956 and scrapped.
 , a  launched in 1943 as USS Brown she was transferred to Greece in 1962 and renamed. She was scrapped in 1981.
 , an  launched in 1977 as HNLMS Van Kinsbergen she was transferred to Greece in 1995 and renamed.

Hellenic Navy ship names